The Charleroi Red Roosters are an ice hockey team in Charleroi, Belgium. They are currently playing in the Belgian Hockey League, the top level of ice hockey in Belgium.

Belgian Hockey League Results

References

Ice hockey teams in Belgium